Madhuvanti is a raga used in Indian classical music. It is a Hindustani music raga, which is reported to have been borrowed into Carnatic music, and is structurally similar to Multani.

This Raga is based on Todi Thaat (Mode). It is a romantic raga based on the foundation, eternity and colors of love. Madhu literally means honey. It is a very sweet raga with a very simple philosophy of love and romance.

Hindustani music
Madhuvanti's notes are N S Mg M P N S'(Mg in meend) while ascending and all the swaras, S' N D P M g R S, in the descent. (notations M - , g-). Madhuvanti belongs to thaat Todi.

Time
Madhuvanti is played after 4 pm before 8 pm.

Rasa
Madhuvanti expresses a gentle loving sentiment. It depicts the sringaar rasa, used to express the love of an individual towards his or her beloved.

Carnatic music

Madhuvanti is the janya raga of the 59th Melakarta of Carnatic Music, Dharmavati.

Structure and Lakshana

Its  structure (ascending and descending scale) is as follows:
: 
: 

The notes used are Chathusruthi Rishabham (R2), Sadharana Gandharam (G2), Prati Madhyamam (M2), Chathusruthi Dhaivatham (D2) and Kakali Nishadham (N3). Notations of Carnatic music and Hindustani music differ a little bit (see swaras in Carnatic music for details on above notation and terms). It is an audava-sampurna raga (5 notes in ascending and all 7 notes in descending scale).

Compositions
Madhuvanti is a popular raga. This raga has been used to compose many tukadas (short compositions sung towards end of Carnatic music concert).

It has also been used in Indian movie songs and music as it lends itself to lilting melodies.

Film Songs

Language:tamil

See also

List of Film Songs based on Ragas

Notes

References

External links 
 More details about raga Madhuvanti

Hindustani ragas
Articles containing video clips
Janya ragas